Facchetti is an Italian surname. Notable people with the surname include:

 Giacinto Facchetti (1942–2006), Italian footballer
 Pietro Facchetti (1539–1613), Italian painter

Italian-language surnames